Dayus is a genus of leafhoppers in the subfamily Typhlocybinae.

Species 
 Dayus bifurcatus - China
 Dayus euryphaessa (Kirkaldy, 1907) - Australia
 Dayus serratus - China
 Dayus trifurcatus - China

References

External links 

Empoascini
Cicadellidae genera
Insects of China